The U.S. Arsenal-Officers Quarters (also known as the Mt. Vernon Arsenal or Chattahoochee Arsenal) is a historic site in Chattahoochee, Florida. It is located at 100 North Main Street, part of the Florida State Hospital on U.S. 90. On July 2, 1973, it was added to the U.S. National Register of Historic Places.

References

External links
 Gadsden County listings at National Register of Historic Places
 Florida's Office of Cultural and Historical Programs
 Gadsden County listings
 Gadsden County markers
 U.S. Arsenal at Chattahoochee - History at Explore Southern History

Buildings and structures in Gadsden County, Florida
Government buildings on the National Register of Historic Places in Florida
Vernacular architecture in Florida
National Register of Historic Places in Gadsden County, Florida
1839 establishments in Florida Territory
Government buildings completed in 1839